Gilles Mirallès (8 February 1966 – 28 January 2022) was a French chess player.

Biography
Mirallès became a Grandmaster in 1997 after winning the French Junior Chess Championship in 1982 and the French Chess Championship in 1986 and 1989. He came in third place in 1990. He also collaborated with the magazine .

He moved to Geneva and became President of the Fédération genevoise d'échecs and director of the École d'échecs de Genève. On 1 January 2011, he was ranked 43rd in France with an Elo rating of 2462.

Mirallès died in Ferney-Voltaire on 28 January 2022, at the age of 55.

References

1966 births
2022 deaths
French chess players
Chess grandmasters
Chess Olympiad competitors
Chess coaches
People from Grasse
Sportspeople from Alpes-Maritimes